is a small Sōtō Zen Buddhist monastery near Kingston in Madison County, Arkansas in the United States. It is located in the Boston Mountains of the Ozarks. The temple focuses primarily on the practice of zazen in the tradition of Kosho Uchiyama and Shohaku Okumura, the latter being the teacher of the founder, Shōryū Bradley. Study of the writings of Eihei Dōgen and the teachings of Shakyamuni Buddha are also emphasized. The monastery holds a five-day sesshin every month except in January and August.

The name Gyōbutsu-ji literally means 'Practice Buddha Temple' and is derived from Eihei Dōgen's magnum opus the Shōbōgenzō, specifically the chapter titled Gyōbutsu igi (行仏威儀). While the standard Classical Chinese interpretation of this title is "practice Buddha's dignified actions", Dōgen re-interpreted it as "dignified actions of the Practice Buddha" in line with his assertion that practice and enlightenment are the same. The chapter explains:

References

2011 establishments in Arkansas
21st-century Buddhist temples
Buddhist organizations
Buddhist monasteries in the United States
Religious organizations established in 2011
Soto Zen
Buddhism in Arkansas
Zen centers in the United States
Buildings and structures in Madison County, Arkansas